Zygaena trifolii, the five-spot burnet,  is a moth in the family Zygaenidae. It is found from North Africa, through the western Mediterranean, Great Britain and central Europe to Ukraine. It is not found in Scandinavia.

The wingspan is 28–33 mm. Adults are on wing from the mid-June to the beginning of August in one generation per year.

The larvae feed on the leaves of Lotus uliginosus and Lotus corniculatus. The species overwinters in the larval stage and may overwinter twice.

Subspecies
Zygaena trifolii trifolii
Zygaena trifolii barcelonensis Reiss, 1922
Zygaena trifolii caerulescens Oberthur, 1910
Zygaena trifolii decreta Verity, 1925
Zygaena trifolii duponcheliana Oberthur, 1910 
Zygaena trifolii espunnica Reiss, 1936
Zygaena trifolii hibera Verity, 1925
Zygaena trifolii lusitaniaemixta Verity, 1930
Zygaena trifolii olbiana Oberthur, 1910
Zygaena trifolii palustrella  Verity, 1925
Zygaena trifolii palustris Oberthur, 1896
Zygaena trifolii pusilla Oberthur, 1910
Zygaena trifolii subsyracusia Verity, 1925
Zygaena trifolii syracusia Zeller, 1847 (the Channel Islands and the coastal regions of north-western France from Loire-Atlantique to Côtes-d’Armor and Ille-et-Vilaine)

References

External links
 Five-spot burnet on UKmoths (Ian Kimber: Guide to the moths of Great Britain and Ireland)
 Moths and Butterflies of Europe and North Africa
 Lepiforum.de
 schmetterling-raupe

Zygaena
Moths of Europe
Moths of Africa
Moths described in 1783
Taxa named by Eugenius Johann Christoph Esper